The Siemens SP260D is a German electric motor for powering electric aircraft, designed and produced by Siemens of Erlangen.

Design and development
The SP260D is a brushless design producing , with an inrunner coil. It has a 95% efficiency. The low working rpm of the engine means that it can turn a propeller at efficient speeds without the need for a reduction drive.

Specifications (SP260D)

See also

References

Aircraft electric engines